Albert Griffiths (1 January 1871 – 10 December 1927), better known as Young Griffo, was a World Featherweight boxing champion from 1890 to 1892, and according to many sources, one of the first boxing world champions in any class. Ring magazine founder Nat Fleischer rated Griffo as the eighth greatest featherweight of all time. He was inducted into the Ring Magazine Hall of Fame in 1954, the International Boxing Hall of Fame in 1991, and the Australian National Boxing Hall of Fame in 2003.

During his career he defeated Abe Willis, champion Ike Weir, Horace Leeds, and Joe Harmon. He won bouts against champion Torpedo Billy Murphy a total of three times, twice in World Featherweight title matches. A prolific boxer of great opponents, after coming to America, he fought champions Solly Smith, "Kid" Lavigne, Joe Gans, Tommy Ryan, George Dixon, Frank Erne, and featherweight contender Joe Bernstein. He was recorded as fighting over two hundred professional fights in his career.

Griffo also put together the most consecutive bouts without defeat in recorded boxing history. As of May 2021, with the addition of Newspaper decisions, boxrec.com lists his record as initially starting off at 7–0–3 before he lost his first fight. After losing, he went on a four-year unbeaten streak of 79–1–38 before being defeated again 124 fights after his first loss.

Early life and titles
Albert Griffiths was born at Millers Point, Sydney, New South Wales, Australia on 1 January 1871. He took his ringname "Young Griffo" early in his career. Griffo turned pro in 1886, and until the age of 22, fought in his home land of Australia.

For four of his most successful years as a boxer, Harry Tuthill was his athletic trainer and Hugh Behan and Sam Tuckhorn were managers, but by his mid career Griffo went through a host of trainers and managers who tired of his drinking habits and unwillingness to train. He said in a 1902 interview with The Cincinnati Enquirer that Larry Foley of Sydney had acted as an important early boxing mentor, and indeed Griffo had trained at Foley's boxing school at Sydney's White Horse Hotel where several of the greatest champions had spent time, including triple weight class champion Bob Fitzsimmons.

Boxing in the United States
In 1893, at the age of 22, he went to America. He boxed in the United States between November 1893 until his retirement from boxing in 1904 and remained there until his death in 1927. He arrived first in San Francisco and may have boxed a few bouts on the West Coast upon his arrival, but accounts differ. One of his first bouts in America was against "Young Scotty" in Chicago on 13 November 1893, where he was reputed to have challenged his opponent to hit him for several minutes while he bobbed his head and managed to avoid nearly every blow. At least one newspaper reported after his death that even in this early stage of his career, he had been pulled from a bar room before the fight with the skilled Black boxer, but his defensive skills in the bout were considered to have been extraordinary with Scotty unable to land a blow.

Bout with future World Featherweight Champion Solly Smith
On 3 January 1894, he fought future World Featherweight champion Solly Smith at the Tivoli Theatre in Chicago to a six-round draw. Smith, who had distinguished himself by the time he met Griffo, would take the World Featherweight Championship the following year.

On 23 January 1894, he fought an eight-round draw with John Van Heest in Chicago, making an impressive performance.

Match with Ike Weir, former world champion
On 17 March 1894, Griffo defeated Ike Weir at the Second Regiment Armory in Chicago. Griffo, as a lightweight, outweighed Weir considerably and dominated the bout, which was stopped by the police in the third round when Weir was down. Weir announced retirement after the bout but returned to the ring for a few more professional bouts and exhibitions. Although the bout officially was called a draw by the referee, Griffo knocked Weir down twice in the third round, with Weir taking a while to get to his feet. Many in the crowd were displeased with the official Draw decision. According to the Inter Ocean, as many as 5,000 were in attendance to watch "three of the fastest, fiercest and most brutal rounds ever fought in an American prize ring". Young Griffo made a veritable chopping block of Ike O'Neil Weir, the "Befast Spider". It is important to note that according to one source, Griffo may have outweighed Wier by as much as 30 lbs. during the bout, but discrepancies in the weights of opponents was more common in this era of boxing. Several newspaper accounts of the fight, written after Griffo's death, wrote that he had been drinking before the bout, but by most accounts he had the edge during most of the fighting, and Weir was a worthy opponent.

On 27 August 1894, he lost to the famed seven-year undefeated World Lightweight Champion Jack McAuliffe in Brooklyn, New York, losing in a 10-round points decision. McAuliffe had lost his World Lightweight Championship only the year before. Griffo had lost few of his fights by referee decision before his bout with the legendary McAuliffe. Due to McAuliffe's extraordinary record as lightweight champion, he was considered one of Griffo's most skilled opponents.

Meeting three champions
Griffo fought an assortment of opponents who would at one time hold world championships.

Bouts with Lightweight contender "Kid" Lavigne
On 10 February 1894, he fought future World Lightweight Champion George "Kid" Lavigne for the first time in an eight-round draw in Chicago. On 12 October 1895, he fought Lavigne in a 20-round draw by points decision in Queens, New York. Lavigne would take the World Lightweight Championship only the following year.

He subsequently fought an eight-round draw with the hard-hitting red head boxer Johnny Griffin at the Casino in Boston on 23 April 1894.

On 17 September 1894, he knocked out Eddie Loeber in only 2 minutes 36 seconds of the first round at the Seaside Athletic Club in Brooklyn. The Brooklyn Daily Eagle, wrote that the two men were very "poorly matched", and that it was a relief when the referee Dominick McAffrey stopped the bout. Hundreds of spectators struggled to shake hands with Griffo after the fight's conclusion.

On 4 March 1895, he defeated Horace Leeds at the Seaside Athletic Club in Coney Island in a 12-round bout in front of a sizable crowd of 4000 spectators. One reporter believed Griffo to be over the 133 pound weight limit, and fighting at a weight of as much as 140. The fighting was fierce, and both men were described as being "badly pummeled" in a close bout that had the betting about even. He lost to Leeds on 7 August 1897, in a four-round newspaper decision in Atlantic City, New Jersey. During this period, he was managed by Hugh Behan, but Griffo had an assortment of trainers in his career.

Bouts with world champion George Dixon
On 28 October 1895, he fought the great Black Canadian champion George Dixon in a 10-round draw by points decision in Manhattan. Dixon had taken the World Featherweight Championship in 1891, and was one of the first recognized world champions. Griffo would fight Dixon two additional times in well attended matches. One source described their 20-round draw as a "battle that bristled throughout with glittering skill and generalship." On 19 January 1895, they would fight a 25-round draw in New York's Coney Island. His manager Hughey Behan had him jailed briefly before the Coney Island bout with Dixon so he could train in a sober state.

Arrests for assault and disorderly conduct
On 11 April 1896, he was arrested at a Casino he frequented in College Point, Long Island, on charges of assault against William Connors, a town trustee. He was discharged shortly after to attend a scheduled bout against boxer Charles McKeever. On 13 April, the day he would have faced trial on the assault charge, he lost the 20-round bout at the Empire Athletic Club with McKeever in Queens, New York, on a points decision of the referee. On 9 June 1896, he was arrested for driving intoxicated and disorderly conduct in Coney Island, New York, and was arraigned at the Coney Island Police Court. He was sentenced to twenty-five days in prison after pleading guilty. Around 20 November 1897, he was arrested for vagrancy in St. Louis, Missouri, but several nights drinking at a bar may have precipitated the arrest. He was not held for long and fought a bout the following month in California. On 28 September 1898, he was arrested in Chicago found running naked on State Street for a quarter mile. He reportedly assaulted the three officers who tried to arrest him. Another source states he had been drinking the night the incident occurred. On 14 January 1899, he was arrested and brought to Chicago's Harrison Street Police Station for struggling with a police officer to prevent the arrest of a Tom McGinty from the Clover Leaf Saloon, around 2:00 AM but released shortly after. He was sent to an insane asylum on 24 March 1899, after being judged insane in Chicago. He was arrested on suspicion of armed robbery against James H. Wilkerson on 9 September 1901, but only one source mentions this arrest. On 2 February 1902, he was discovered in the cold in a vacant lot near the Bridewell in Chicago, where he had been serving a sentence for disorderly conduct. It was feared he would lose his hands from frostbite. On 6 February 1902, he was sent back to an asylum. Around 25 February 1903, he was sent back to the Bridewell in Chicago for three months for "making trouble".

Three bouts with future Welterweight Champion Joe Gans

He fought the legendary World Light and Welterweight Champion Joe Gans three times, but never winning a bout. Griffo's 18 November 1895 bout with Gans in Gan's home of Baltimore, Maryland, appeared to some to be only an exhibition, with which many in the crowd were disappointed. A few even considered the bout a "fix", as Griffo told the audience, he had agreed not to "put out" Gans during the bout. Griffo considered his 15-round draw in Athens, Pennsylvania, at the Olympic Athletic Club on 21 September 1897 one of his best, as well as one of Gans' most skilled displays. Of his 10 July 1900 bout with Gans, an eighth-round loss by technical knockout at the Seaside Athletic Club, one source wrote, the referee stopped the bout one minute and 30 econds into the eighth round when "Griffo was so far gone that another punch from Gans would have put him out." Griffo was reported to have shown some of his early form, but was no match for the blows and conditioning of the "old master" Joe Gans, and was believed by one reporter to have had less stamina as the fight wound on. Griffo was down in both the first and seventh rounds, and he took off nearly a year from his boxing after this last fight with Gans.

Bouts with champions Frank Erne, and Billy Murphy
He met one time World Featherweight and Lightweight champion Frank Erne on 20 December 1895 in a four-round non-title fight that resulted in a draw in Buffalo, New York.

He defeated Torpedo Billy Murphy in a non-title match ending in an eight-round points decision at the Casino in Boston on 7 May 1894. His 20-round draw bout with Jack Everhardt on 10 July 1896 in Buffalo, New York, was billed as a World 135 pound title. He had previously met Everhardt in a pre-arranged six-round draw in Brooklyn on 25 May, at which the crowd would have preferred a decision by the referee. He lost to World Welter and Middleweight Champion Tommy Ryan on 21 June 1897 in a non-title match in a third-round technical knockout in Brooklyn, New York.

Late boxing career

Serving time
On 15 August 1896, he was sentenced in Brooklyn to one year in prison for an assault on William Gottlieb the previous April. He did not box from August 1896 until June 1897.

Boxing after release
On 12 July 1897, he fought well known lightweight Owen Ziegler, in Philadelphia, Pennsylvania, in a six-round bout, which he won by newspaper decision. He considered Ziegler one of his more important opponents.

He fought a close bout with Horace Leeds on 7 August 1897 in Atlantic City, New Jersey, in which The Philadelphia Inquirer felt Leeds had received more points.

On 18 November 1897, Griffo was believed to have been drunk in a contest with Tom Tracey at the Colliseum in St. Louis. He rolled out of the boxing ring in the first round, and referee George Siler declared a No Contest. One source confirmed his story that he had been in a car accident before the fight which was the cause of his inability to complete the first round. The San Francisco Call wrote that Griffo's vehicle had been struck by a street car on the way to the bout, and that he had suffered a sprained shoulder as a result. He and two of his seconds were treated for injuries received as a result of the accident.

He was defeated in an upset by Frank McConnell before three thousand spectators on 3 February 1898 in a 15-rounds points decision in San Francisco, California. McConnell only recently emerged from the amateur ranks, and had relatively little experience as a professional. Griffo showed great defensive skills in several rounds, but McConnell won the bout by taking the offensive throughout most of the fight.

On 26 March 1898, he won a bout with the well known Black boxer, Young Peter Jackson in Red Bluff, California on a fourth-round disqualification. A few at ringside claimed that Jackson was actually Joe Gans, but this was found to be untrue.

Tragic bout with Bull McCarthy
On the evening of 27 April 1898, he fought Joseph Devitt, who gave the name of the boxer "Bull" McCarthy, in Sacramento, California. Griffo won the 20-round bout by knockout, but Devitt died the following evening of his injuries at Sister's Hospital. Devitt was diagnosed with a brain concussion, likely caused by a rain of blows to his head during the bout. Griffo was briefly taken into custody on charges of manslaughter as a result of the fight. The tragic result was a source of strong remorse for Griffo but it did not deter him from continuing his profession.

Late career decline
On 19 December 1901, he was advised to retire from boxing due to a "valvular affection of the heart that may bring death to him in the ring at any time." The diagnosis was made by a Dr. McGregor of the Olympic Athletic Club, and if accurate should have ended his boxing career.

On 22 August 1902, he lost to three-time World Featherweight Title contender Joe Bernstein in Baltimore, Maryland in a 20-round points decision.

He lost to lightweight boxer Joe Tipman in a fifth-round knockout on 29 September 1902 in Baltimore.

In December 1902, after defeating Jack Bain in a ninth-round knockout in Baltimore, he took off at least a year from boxing before his fight with George Memsic around December 1903, also in Baltimore. In this stage of his career he was managed by Sam Tuckhorn, who was hoping to revive his career and convince the public of his fighting skills, but Griffo was nearing the end of his career.

On 7 December 1903 in Peoria, Illinois, he defeated Jim Kenney in a four-round decision. Griffo showed great speed and cleverness according to the referee, Tom Dunn.

One of his last well publicized bouts was a loss by first-round knockout against Tommy White on 10 February 1904 in Chicago, Illinois. He was already thirty-three at the time, and his age, drinking, and enormous number of previous fights had begun to tell on his speed and endurance in the ring. He was arrested in September 1909 in Chicago, as relatives from Australia had requested his arrest so as to help him obtain treatment for his drinking. Cyber Boxing Zone has him fighting two six-round, no-decision fights as late as 1911 with Welterweight champion William "Honey" Melody in September and Mike Leonard in May in New York, but these bouts were not confirmed by BoxRec and other boxers used the name Young Griffo. He served time at the Bridewell in Chicago, but was released around 28 November 1910, and returned to New York. He had plans to go on the vaudeville circuit with Charles Griffin, another boxer.

In a tribute to Griffo, boxer Tommy Sullivan wrote in the 6 March 1916 Tacoma Daily News:
Not known as much of a puncher, but his skill was uncanny. He had wonderful head work, almost impenetrable defense, dazzling feints, and rapid two-handed methods of attack. The cleverest boxers and hardest punchers were made to look ridiculous when exchanging swats with him. He had a dislike of training and was deemed lazy. There were times he got drunk before a match [such as the Ike Weir and Tommy Tracy bouts].

Brief film career
He appeared as himself in the 1895 lost short Young Griffo vs. Battling Charles Barnett, which at least one source claims is the first film shown for profit. He appeared in at least two other films.

Apparently, two of his film roles were released near or after his death. Released in 1927, he had a minor role in Frank Capra's comedy Long Pants, and the following year in Harry Edwards' 1928 comedy The Best Man.

Tragic life after boxing
In March 1912, Griffo requested to be sent to the New York workhouse, partly a victim of alcoholism, which had affected him intermittently throughout his career. On 11 July 1912, he briefly was jailed for "almstaking" or begging. He had been arrested previously for begging.

For the last 15 years of his life, he took donations and met friends at the entrance to New York's Rialto Theatre on Broadway and 42nd Street, becoming increasingly destitute by 1925. He spent some of his later years in asylums, and received a portion of his income from benefits staged by his friends. He had gained over 50 lbs. by the time of his death. He died in New York of heart disease, initially diagnosed as indigestion, on 7 December 1927 at age 56. He received medical aid too late after dragging himself into a hall from his small, rent-free room in a West side New York boarding house paid for by Jane F. Fish, an author of children's books. Many American newspapers ran stories on his life as a tragic tale of the effects of alcohol. He left no children nor were there any heirs that laid claim to his estate.

Friends of his from the boxing and theatrical community provided for a burial. Several newspaper accounts after his death attributed his financial plight in part to his illiteracy as well as a poor understanding of numbers and currency, which made him an easy victim of unscrupulous handlers.

He was laid to rest at Woodlawn Cemetery after a service at the Madison Avenue Baptist Church. Ring notables in attendance included Jack McAuliffe, Kid McPartland, Tommy Burns, James J. Corbett, and wealthy boxing promoter Tex Rickard, who provided funding for the burial plot and casket. Jane F. Fish also contributed to his funeral. Rickard was later repaid $500 of the $885 of funeral expenses he had donated out of a $3800 estate found to be attributed to Griffo after the funeral.

Professional boxing record
All information in this section is derived from BoxRec, unless otherwise stated.

Official record

All newspaper decisions are officially regarded as "no decision" bouts and are not counted in the win/loss/draw column.

Unofficial record

Record with the inclusion of newspaper decisions to the win/loss/draw column.

Boxing achievements

|-

References

External links
 
 Griffo: his life story and record / told by Jack Read (1926?)
 Young Griffo: the will o'wisp of the roped square / Nat Fleischer (1928)

 Pictures held and digitised as part of the Arnold Thomas boxing collection by the National Library of Australia:
 Albert Griffiths "Griffo", Feather Champion of the World, c1890
 Albert Griffiths, 1893?
 Albert Griffiths, c1927 "shortly before his death"

World featherweight boxing champions
World boxing champions
1871 births
1927 deaths
Boxers from Sydney
Australian male boxers
Australian people convicted of assault
Sportspeople convicted of crimes
Sport Australia Hall of Fame inductees